Denise O'Sullivan (born 4 February 1994) is an Irish professional footballer who plays as a midfielder for the American club North Carolina Courage of the National Women's Soccer League (NWSL) and the Republic of Ireland national team which she has represented 80 times. She started her career with the Irish club Wilton United and joined the newly-formed Cork City at the outset of the Women's National League (WNL) in 2011. She also played for Peamount United in the County Dublin club's UEFA Women's Champions League campaigns in 2011 and 2012. In July 2013, she signed her first professional contract with Glasgow City of the Scottish Women's Premier League (SWPL).

After a successful spell in Glasgow, which included being named 2014 SWPL Players' Player of the Year, O'Sullivan signed with Houston Dash of the NWSL in March 2016. In 2017, she signed with North Carolina Courage and helped the team win three consecutive NWSL Shield titles and two consecutive NWSL Championships. At North Carolina, O'Sullivan was voted most valuable player (MVP) by her teammates in both 2018 and 2019. She played on-loan for Australian W-League clubs Canberra United and Western Sydney Wanderers and English club Brighton & Hove Albion during the NWSL offseason.

In 2015, O'Sullivan was named FAI Senior International Player of the Year. She earned The Irish Times/Sport Ireland Sportswoman of Month honors in November 2019 and was on the RTÉ Sports Person of the Year shortlist the same year.

Early life

O'Sullivan was born in Cork and grew up in Knocknaheeny. The youngest of nine children, her brother John Paul played soccer for Ireland at youth international level. O'Sullivan learned to play football on the streets with her siblings and as a youth looked up to Roy Keane. She played for a boys' team, Nufarm Athletic, until age 11 when she had to leave due to rules against mixed-sex football. As a youth being one of the only girls playing football, O'Sullivan experienced pushback from some boys who felt football was a game for men and boys. This behaviour pushed her to prove them wrong. She recalled, "I used to always surprise them. They were stronger and faster, but I was technically better than them." She credits her toughness and passing skills to her childhood playing with boys. "[Back then] you'd only have one or two touches and there would be a boy smashing you. So, you'd have to let the ball go fast."

Club career

Beginnings
O'Sullivan began her football career with Irish club Wilton United. On 27 July 2008, she won the FAI Women's Under-14 National Cup, scoring twice in the final against Longford Town. On 7 August 2011, she scored a goal in the FAI Women's Cup final, as Wilton United were defeated 3–1 by St Catherine's.

Peamount United and Cork (2011–2013)
After her performance in the 2011 FAI Women's Cup final, O'Sullivan signed with Peamount United, ahead of their 2011–12 UEFA Women's Champions League campaign. She made three appearances in the Champions League for the South Dublin club, before returning to her hometown and joining newly founded Cork Women's FC, one of the six teams that competed in the Women's National League's (WNL) inaugural 2011–12 season. On 13 November 2011, she made her debut in a 6–1 loss to Peamount United. On 15 January 2012, she scored her first goal in a 3–1 away win over Wexford Youths. In her first season, she scored six goals in 15 appearances and was named to the league's Best XI. In July 2012, O'Sullivan re-joined Peamount United and made three appearances in the Champions League, scoring a goal in a 4–0 victory against Cardiff Metropolitan. After the club's exit from the Champions League, she returned to Cork and finished her second season with two goals in 11 appearances.

Glasgow City (2013–2015)
On 10 July 2013, O'Sullivan joined Scottish champions Glasgow City, ahead of their 2013–14 UEFA Women's Champions League campaign. She scored on her league debut, on 28 July, in a 2–0 win over Rangers. On 8 August, she made her Champions League debut for the club in a 7–0 home victory against ŽNK Osijek. Her goal in a 3–1 win over Standard Liège on 17 October helped Glasgow City progress into the last 16 of the Champions League. On 16 November, it was announced that O'Sullivan had signed new contract with the club. She finished the 2013 season with three goals in 12 appearances in all competitions.

O'Sullivan made nine appearances in the 2014–15 UEFA Women's Champions League campaign and scored four goals, including a brace in a 4–0 victory against Zhytlobud-1 Kharkiv on 14 August 2014. After lifting the domestic treble and being part of the first Scottish team to ever reach the quarter-finals of the Champions League, she was voted SWPL Players' Player of the Year. On 16 December 2014, she signed a new two-year contract with Glasgow City. In August 2015, she was named SWPL Player of the Month. She was also named Glasgow City Players' Player of the Year, Coaches' Player of the Year and Fans' Player of the Year in both 2014 and 2015.

Houston Dash (2016–2017)

On 19 March 2016, O'Sullivan signed with the Houston Dash, who paid Glasgow an undisclosed "four figure" transfer fee, which was the first time a Scottish women's club was paid a compensation fee for a player. She made her first appearance during the 2016 season in a 0–0 home draw with Sky Blue on 30 April, coming on as a substitute in the 46th minute. On 7 May, she came on as a substitute at halftime and scored her first goal in a 2–1 away victory against 2015 champion FC Kansas City. She finished the 2016 season with 2 goals and 5 assists in 18 appearances.

During the 2017 season, O'Sullivan appeared in 11 games for Houston and tallied an assist. When Randy Waldrum, who had brought her to the club, was sacked, interim coach Omar Morales restricted her to minimal playing time. In the middle of the season on 26 July, she requested to be placed on waivers to be picked up by another team.

North Carolina Courage (2017–present)
On 28 July 2017, O'Sullivan was claimed off waivers by the North Carolina Courage. On 10 August, she made her debut in a 1–0 win over FC Kansas City. The Courage finished in first place during the regular season with a  record, winning the NWSL Shield and advanced to the Playoffs. The game that clinched the NWSL Shield for the Courage was against O'Sullivan's former team, Houston Dash. The Courage won 4–0. On 8 October, O'Sullivan scored the game-winning goal in the 89th minute of the semi-final against the Chicago Red Stars. She made a total of nine appearances for the Courage in 2017 and scored one goal.

During the 2018 regular season, O'Sullivan made 22 appearances with 22 starts playing primarily as a holding midfielder. She played a total of 1,932 minutes on the pitch for the Courage. North Carolina finished in first place and won the NWSL Shield for the second consecutive season with a  record. O'Sullivan was voted the Most Valuable Player (MVP) on the team by her Courage teammates at the end of the season. On 22 September, O'Sullivan played the entire match as the Courage won the NWSL Championship 3–0 over the Portland Thorns FC, the first time the Courage had won the title. O'Sullivan was named MVP by her team.

During the 2019 season, O'Sullivan was a starter in 22 of the 24 games she played. The Courage finished in first place with a  record winning the NWSL Shield for the third consecutive season. On 11 October, the Courage announced that O'Sullivan had been voted MVP by the team for the second consecutive year. O'Sullivan had distributed 1,102 passes (50 per game) and had a pass success rate of 84%. After defeating Reign FC 4–1 in the semi-finals, O'Sullivan helped lead the Courage win their second NWSL Championship shutting out the Chicago Red Stars 4–0 in the final. O'Sullivan started and played the entire match. Teammate Sam Mewis said O'Sullivan was 'the "glue" that holds the team together, winning tackles and spraying the ball wide from a deeper position.'

In November 2019, O'Sullivan signed a multi-year contract with the Courage. Head coach Riley said, "She is one of the first names on the team sheet every week. She is a massive influencer in the way we play. She has a genius soccer IQ that makes her a brilliant reader and manipulator of the game. She is a tremendous footballer and passer of the ball and she breaks up the opponent's playmaking ability with an intuitive reading of the game."

Loans

On 18 October 2018, O'Sullivan was signed by Canberra United as their guest player for the 2018–19 W-League season and was given the number 11 shirt. As a guest player in the W-League, she is permitted to play seven non-consecutive games. On 28 October 2018, she made her debut in a 2–0 home victory against Melbourne City. The Sydney Morning Herald reported that O'Sullivan had been "a sensation" in her seven games for the club.

For the 2019–20 W-League season, O'Sullivan was loaned once again to an Australian club, joining her North Carolina Courage teammates Lynn Williams and Kristen Hamilton at Western Sydney Wanderers as a guest player. She made her debut for the club on 22 November during a 1–0 against Newcastle Jets FC. During a 4–0 win against Canberra United on 26 December, she scored in the 59th minute doubling the team's advantage. O'Sullivan was a starting midfielder in all seven games that she played. Western Sydney finished the regular season in fourth place. Their fourth place finish earned the team a berth to the semi-finals where they were defeated 5–1 by eventual champions, Melbourne City.

In September 2020, O'Sullivan moved on loan to English FA WSL club Brighton & Hove Albion through 31 December 2020. She wanted to be available for Ireland's rescheduled UEFA Women's Euro 2022 qualifying Group I fixtures. Travelling back and forth from the United States would force her to undergo three separate two-week periods of quarantine within nine weeks. She made her debut for Brighton as a half-time substitute for fellow Corkonian Megan Connolly in a 0–0 draw at Manchester City on 13 September 2020. She was a starting midfielder in eight of the nine matches she played.

International career

Youth

O'Sullivan was part of the under-17 team that finished in second place at the 2010 UEFA Women's Under-17 Championship, after losing on penalties in the final against Spain. At the 2010 FIFA U-17 Women's World Cup in Trinidad and Tobago, she scored in the quarter-final defeat against eventual runners-up Japan, after helping Ireland finish top of a group that included Brazil, Canada and Ghana.

Senior
On 17 September 2011, O'Sullivan made her senior debut and scored both goals in a 2–0 UEFA Women's Euro 2013 qualifying Group 4 win over Wales in Newport. She headed Ireland into the lead over Scotland in their Euro 2013 qualifier at Tynecastle Stadium in April 2012, but the Scots staged a late comeback to win 2–1.

O'Sullivan continued to be selected by national team coach Susan Ronan and participated in Ireland's failed 2015 FIFA Women's World Cup qualification campaign. Alongside namesake Fiona O'Sullivan she was the team's joint-top goalscorer with three goals. She was named 2015 FAI Senior International Player of the Year.

She remained an important national team player under Ronan's successor Colin Bell, displaying good form in the unsuccessful 2019 FIFA Women's World Cup qualifying series.

International goals

Scores and results list Ireland's goal tally first.

Style of play
O'Sullivan emerged as a promising forward with the Irish youth national teams. She developed into a midfield playmaker, described by her North Carolina Courage coach Paul Riley as one of the most "gifted and complete" in world football: "She has a massive impact on tactics because she controls the tempo, dictates the tempo and her job functions are multi-faceted."

O'Sullivan is noted as an aggressive player and was nicknamed "junkyard" by her coach. In November 2019, Ireland's head coach Vera Pauw declared O'Sullivan one of the best players in the world: "There is no player in the world at this moment that is a playmaker but also the motor in winning the ball back. She has everything." In December 2019, she was included in The Guardian's The 100 Best Female Footballers In The World and was described as "a combative presence in the Courage midfield [and] the heartbeat of Paul Riley's successful side."

Honours

Club

Glasgow City
SWPL: 2013, 2014, 2015
SWPL Cup: 2014, 2015
Scottish Women's Cup: 2013, 2014, 2015
North Carolina Courage
NWSL Championship: 2018, 2019
NWSL Shield: 2017, 2018, 2019

Individual
WNL Best XI: 2011–12
SWPL Players' Player of the Year: 2014
FAI Senior International Player of the Year: 2015
 RTÉ Sports Person of the Year shortlist: 2019
 NWSL Players' Team of the Year:  2019
 The Irish Times/Sport Ireland Sportswoman of Month: November 2019
 W-League Player of the Month: December 2019

See also 
 List of foreign NWSL players
 List of foreign W-League (Australia) players

References

Further reading
 Grainey, Timothy (2012), Beyond Bend It Like Beckham: The Global Phenomenon of Women's Soccer, University of Nebraska Press, 
 Hong, Fan (2004), Soccer, Women, Sexual Liberation: Kicking Off a New Era, F.Cass, 
 Hurley, Jacquie (2020), Girls Play Too: Inspiring Stories of Irish Sportswomen, Merrion Press,

External links

Denise O'Sullivan at Houston Dash
Denise O'Sullivan at North Carolina Courage
Denise O'Sullivan at Extratime.ie

1994 births
Living people
Association footballers from County Cork
Republic of Ireland women's association footballers
Republic of Ireland women's international footballers
Glasgow City F.C. players
Peamount United F.C. players
Women's National League (Ireland) players
Cork City W.F.C. players
Irish expatriate sportspeople in Scotland
Expatriate women's footballers in Scotland
Republic of Ireland expatriate association footballers
Houston Dash players
National Women's Soccer League players
North Carolina Courage players
Women's association football forwards
Irish expatriate sportspeople in the United States
Irish expatriate sportspeople in England
Expatriate women's footballers in England
Brighton & Hove Albion W.F.C. players
Women's Super League players
Republic of Ireland women's youth international footballers